Project Bacchus was a covert investigation by the  Defense Threat Reduction Agency US Defense Department to determine whether it is possible to construct a bioweapons production facility with off-the-shelf equipment.

History

The project
Project Bacchus operated from 1999-2000 to investigate whether would-be terrorists could build an anthrax production facility and remain undetected. During the two-year simulation, the facility was constructed, and successfully produced an anthrax-like bacterium.

Reportage
The secret Project Bacchus was disclosed in a September 2001 article in The New York Times. Reporters Judith Miller, Stephen Engelberg and William J. Broad collaborated on the article.  Shortly after it appeared, they published a book containing further details. The book, Germs: Biological Weapons and America's Secret War, and the article are the only publicly available sources concerning Project Bacchus and its sister projects, Clear Vision and Jefferson.

References

Further reading
Tucker, Jonathan B. "Biological Threat Assessment: Is the Cure Worse Than the Disease?", Arms Control Today, October 2004, accessed January 6, 2009.
Miller, Judith, Engelberg, Stephen and Broad, William J. Germs: Biological Weapons and America's Secret War, (Google Books), Simon & Schuster, 2002,.
-- " U.S. Germ Warfare Research Pushes Treaty Limits", The New York Times, September 4, 2001, accessed January 6, 2009.

Bacchus
Bacchus
Bacchus
Bioterrorism